Border Reivers is a light warfare/economic development board game designed by Jackson Pope published in 2006 by Reiver Games in English.  Players assume the roles of clans on the Scottish and English Borders during the Middle Ages, striving to achieve ascendancy via economic or military means.

Border Reivers can be played by two to four players and takes around 30 to 90 minutes to play.

Gameplay
Players take it in turns to complete six phases of their turns. The game ends when all but one player have been annihilated, or a player starts their turn with 40 gold.

The six phases are:

 Cards Phase 1: Play any card with the text At the beginning of your turn.
 Reinforcements Phase: Gamble gold to gain extra armies and/or a choice of strategic cards.
 Actions Phase: Perform actions with armies to move, cultivate the game board, settle new towns and cities or build fortifications.
 Combat Phase: Fight any battles that result from the movement of their armies.
 Taxation Phase: Gain income from their towns, cities and the mine.
 Cards Phase 2: Play any card with the text At the end of your turn.

Strategy
Strategically, Border Reivers is based around the need to balance spending your money on the reinforcements necessary to cement your clan's safety and improve your economy, while keeping enough money available to rein in a player who tries to race to an economic victory.

The game is often won by the player who best judges when to stop spending their income and start saving for an economic victory. However, careful use of the strategy cards will enable other players to delay or even stop a player saving for victory.

The ability to choose the strategy card received in the reinforcements phase makes the cards a powerful tool for winning the game.

External links
 Border Reivers homepage at Reiver Games
 

Board games introduced in 2006
Board games about history